John Edward "Charlie" Rogers (born June 19, 1976) is an American former professional football player who was a running back and wide receiver in the National Football League (NFL) for the Seattle Seahawks (1999–2001), the Houston Texans (2002), the Buffalo Bills (2002) and the Miami Dolphins (2003).

Rogers led the NFL in average punt return yardage in his rookie season, 1999.  He also returned a kickoff 85 yards for a touchdown in the Seattle Seahawks playoff loss to the Miami Dolphins (the last points scored by a Seahawk in Kingdome history).

Rogers was in the 2002 NFL Expansion Draft. He was drafted by the Houston Texans, 13th overall.

Rogers played college football with the Georgia Tech Yellow Jackets and attended high school at Matawan Regional High School and is now currently the head football coach for the Matawan Midgets.

References

External links
 Career Statistics

1976 births
Living people
Matawan Regional High School alumni
People from Aberdeen Township, New Jersey
Players of American football from New Jersey
Sportspeople from Monmouth County, New Jersey
American football running backs
American football wide receivers
American football return specialists
Georgia Tech Yellow Jackets football players
Seattle Seahawks players
Buffalo Bills players
Miami Dolphins players